The Province of Bari was a province in the region of Apulia, Italy. Its capital was the city of Bari.

On 1 January 2015 it was replaced by the Metropolitan City of Bari.

List of comuni

 Acquaviva delle Fonti
 Adelfia
 Alberobello
 Altamura
 Bari
 Binetto
 Bitetto
 Bitonto
 Bitritto
 Capurso
 Casamassima
 Cassano delle Murge
 Castellana Grotte
 Cellamare
 Conversano
 Corato
 Gioia del Colle
 Giovinazzo
 Gravina in Puglia
 Grumo Appula
 Locorotondo
 Modugno
 Mola di Bari
 Molfetta
 Monopoli
 Noci
 Noicattaro
 Palo del Colle
 Poggiorsini
 Polignano a Mare
 Putignano
 Rutigliano
 Ruvo di Puglia
 Sammichele di Bari
 Sannicandro di Bari
 Santeramo in Colle
 Terlizzi
 Toritto
 Triggiano
 Turi
 Valenzano
 Andria (to Barletta-Andria-Trani in 2009)
 Barletta (to Barletta-Andria-Trani in 2009)
 Bisceglie (to Barletta-Andria-Trani in 2009)
 Canosa di Puglia (to Barletta-Andria-Trani in 2009)
 Minervino Murge (to Barletta-Andria-Trani in 2009)
 Spinazzola (to Barletta-Andria-Trani in 2009)
 Trani (to Barletta-Andria-Trani in 2009)

Economy
The arable land in the former province of Bari is exploited with the cultivation of olive and grapes but also cherries, peaches, and almonds. From that agricultural activity is derived olive oil, wine and table grapes. Bitonto is especially noted for its extra virgin olive oil, Corato, with its own autochthonous variety "Coratina", and Giovinazzo are along notable producing areas. The centers of wine production are mainly concentrated in Gravina and Ruvo di Puglia, in the north of Bari, and Adelfia, Noicattaro, Rutigliano and Locorotondo, in the south of Bari. Also important is the production of cherries; the Apulian red is especially prevalent in the countryside of Turi and Putignano.

References